Cro-Magnon is an Aurignacian (Upper Paleolithic) site, located in a rock shelter at Les Eyzies, a hamlet in the commune of Les Eyzies-de-Tayac-Sireuil, Dordogne, southwestern France.

Most notably, it is the site of the discovery of anatomically modern human remains, apparently buried at the site,  dated to about 28,000 years ago. Because of its archeological importance, Abri de Cro-Magnon was inscribed on the UNESCO World Heritage List as part of the Prehistoric Sites and Decorated Caves of the Vézère Valley site.

Human remains 

In 1868, workmen found animal bones, flint tools, and human skulls in the rock shelter. French geologist Louis Lartet was called for excavations, and found the partial skeletons of four prehistoric adults and one infant, along with perforated shells used as ornaments, an object made from ivory, and worked reindeer antler.

These "Cro-Magnon men" were identified as the prehistoric human race of Europe, as distinct from Neanderthal Man, described a few years earlier by William King based on the Neanderthal 1 fossil discovered in Germany in 1856. Lartet proposed the subspecies name Homo sapiens fossilis  in 1869. The term "Cro-Magnon Man" soon came to be used in a general sense to describe the oldest modern people in Europe. By the 1970s, the term was used for any early modern human wherever found, as was the case with the far-flung Jebel Qafzeh remains in Israel and various Paleo-Indians in the Americas. The term "Cro-Magnon" remains in use, but since the late 1990s has typically been restricted to European early modern humans.

Cro-Magnon 1 consists of a skull and partial skeletal remains belonging to a male individual, approximately 40 years old. It is dated to 27,680 ± 270 Before Present (BP). The cranial cavity measures .

Cro-Magnon 2 is a partially preserved female skull with marked facial similarities to Mladeč 2.

Cro-Magnon 3 is a partial skull of a male adult.

The remains are thought to represent adults who died at an advanced age, who were placed at the site, along with pieces of shell and animal teeth in what appear to have been pendants or necklaces, in an apparent intentional burial. The presence of necklaces and tools suggests the concept of grave goods.

Analysis of the pathology of the skeletons shows that the humans of this period led a physically difficult life. In addition to infection, several of the individuals found at the shelter had fused vertebrae in their necks, indicating traumatic injury; the adult female found at the shelter had survived for some time with a skull fracture. As these injuries would be life-threatening even today, this suggests that Cro-Magnons relied on community support and took care of each other's injuries. In addition, Cro-Magnon 1 suffered from a genetic condition called Neurofibromatosis type I, which would have led him to have large cysts or tumours on his face, evident in the depression in the frontal bone and pits of the eyebrows and cheek bones.

Compared to Neanderthals, the skeletons showed the same high forehead, upright posture and slender (gracile) skeleton as modern humans. The other specimens from the site are a female, Cro-Magnon 2, and male remains, Cro-Magnon 3.

See also 
 
 Archaic human admixture with modern humans
 List of human evolution fossils
 Neanderthal extinction
 Peopling of Europe

Notes and references

Notes

References

External links 

 Cro-Magnon 1: Smithsonian Institution – The Human Origins Program

1868 archaeological discoveries
Aurignacian
Archaeological sites in France
Prehistoric Sites and Decorated Caves of the Vézère Valley
Rock shelters